Arcot or Arkat may refer to :

 Arcot, Vellore, city near Chennai, in present Tamil Nadu, southern India
 the princely Arcot State in the Carnatic region, where the above city was seat of the Nawabs of Arcot, during early British Raj.
 Arcot (State Assembly Constituency), in the Tamil Nadu legislative assembly.
 North Arcot, former district under Madras Presidency, split in 1989 into present-day Tiruvannamalai District and Vellore District.
 South Arcot, former district under Madras Presidency, split in 1993 into Cuddalore District and Villupuram District.